Greatest Hits, Vol. 1 is a compilation album by the American experimental rock group The Flaming Lips. The first two discs are entirely made up of songs that span from 1992's Hit to Death in the Future Head to 2017's Oczy Mlody, with the third disc featuring demos, B-sides, rarities, and the band's contributions to movie soundtracks.

Release 
On April 27, 2018, it was announced that The Flaming Lips would release a new compilation album titled Greatest Hits, Vol. 1 on June 1 through Warner Bros. Records.

Reception

AllMusic's Heather Phares noted that it "does an admirable job of boiling down their sprawling quarter-century stint on Warner Bros. into a slightly more manageable three-disc set", ultimately concluding that the album "caters to all levels of Flaming Lips fans and does it well".

Track listing
All tracks written by Coyne/Drozd/Ivins, except when noted.

References

2018 compilation albums
The Flaming Lips compilation albums
Warner Records compilation albums